The Minister of Customs in New Zealand is a cabinet position appointed by the Prime Minister to be in charge of matters of border control, international trade and travel and the collection of import duties and taxes to New Zealand. The minister is responsible for the New Zealand Customs Service which is the oldest government department in New Zealand.

The current minister is Meka Whaitiri of the Labour Party. She held the position previously from 2017 to 2018, although was removed following allegations of assault which she denied, but was re-appointed to the role, albeit as Minister outside of Cabinet following the 2020 New Zealand general election.

List of ministers
The following ministers have held the office of Minister of Customs.

Key

Notes

References

Customs
Political office-holders in New Zealand